Serra d'Aiello is a  town and comune of Arbëreshë origin in the province of Cosenza in the Calabria region of southern Italy.

References

Arbëresh settlements

Cities and towns in Calabria